Klonsky is a surname. Notable people with the surname include:

Michael Klonsky (born 1943), American educator, author, and communist activist, son of Robert
Robert Klonsky (1918–2002), American Spanish Civil War veteran and communist activist